The 2002 Prix de l'Arc de Triomphe was a horse race held at Longchamp on Sunday 6 October 2002. It was the 81st running of the Prix de l'Arc de Triomphe.

The winner was Marienbard, a five-year-old horse trained in Great Britain by Saeed bin Suroor. The winning jockey was Frankie Dettori.

Race details
 Sponsor: Groupe Lucien Barrière
 Purse: €1,600,000; First prize: €914,240 
 Going: Good
 Distance: 2,400 metres
 Number of runners: 16
 Winner's time: 2m 26.7s

Full result

 Abbreviations: shd = short-head; snk = short-neck

Winner's details
Further details of the winner, Marienbard.
 Sex: Horse
 Foaled: 26 May 1997
 Country: Ireland
 Sire: Caerleon; Dam: Marienbad (Darshaan)
 Owner: Godolphin
 Breeder: Saif Ali

References

External links
 Colour Chart – Arc 2002

Prix de l'Arc de Triomphe
 2002
Prix de l'Arc de Triomphe
Prix de l'Arc de Triomphe
Prix de l'Arc de Triomphe